Arthur Tatton (1811-1885) was an Irish Anglican priest: the  Archdeacon of Kilfenora from 1864 until his death.

He was born in Cork and educated at Trinity College, Dublin He was ordained deacon in 1841 and priest in 1842. He held incumbencies at Drumcliff and Kilmanaheen.

Notes

Alumni of Trinity College Dublin
Archdeacons of Kilfenora
19th-century Irish Anglican priests
Clergy from Cork (city)
1811 births
1885 deaths